Edward Milne Community School is one of three secondary schools in the School District 62 Sooke right now. It is located in Sooke, British Columbia, Canada. Roughly 700 students attend in grades 9 to 12 in both regular and French immersion programs. The school services the areas of Sooke, East Sooke, Jordan River, and Port Renfrew.

Sports 
EMCS has lots of opportunities for sports programs, such as Hockey Academy and Soccer Academy, as well as rugby, volleyball, and basketball teams.

External links
 Edward Milne Community School 
 School District 62 

High schools in British Columbia
Educational institutions in Canada with year of establishment missing